The 2009 Town of Bedford municipal election took place on November 1, 2009, to elect a mayor and councillors in the town of Bedford, Quebec. Incumbent mayor Claude Dubois was returned without opposition.

Results

Claude Dubois was president of the Missisquoi County Fair before running for public office. He was first elected as mayor of Bedford in 2003 and was re-elected without opposition in 2005 and 2009.

Luc Gnocchini was first elected to the Bedford town council in 2003. He was re-elected in 2005 and 2009. The latter election was the first time he faced opposition.

Madeleine Campbell Fortin was first elected to the Bedford town council in 1987. She has served on the health and social services network of Brome—Missisquoi. She also has been president of the school committee of Notre-Dame-de-Stanbridge and a board member of CLSC La Pommeraie.

Source: Official Results, Government of Quebec.

References

2009 Quebec municipal elections